Thomas Jeannerot (born 30 March 1984) is a French professional athlete in parachuting. He is currently high-level athlete and member of the French Team of Parachuting in the double discipline Accuracy landing and Style.

He is in particular Overall (Accuracy Landing and Style) World Champion in 2010 and European Vice Champion of Accuracy in 2011. He has also set the new World Record of Team Accuracy with the French Team in 2011 (with a perfect jump 0 cm). 2013 is the year he broke the individual World Record of Accuracy (with 2 cm in 10 rounds). He has already got a very rich palmares  including National and International Podiums (Individual and Team).

Statistics 
 Starting Year : 1999
 Numbers of Jumps : 9000
 World Champion 2010
 Accuracy World Record : Team 2011 / Individual 2013
 Starting French Team : 2004

Accuracy Landing World Record (December 2013) 

The last international competition in Accuracy Landing of the 2013 season has got together all the best specialists in the World at the amazing place of Skydive Dubai Parachuting Club (Palm Islands).
And this competition has given a level never reached before.

The Dubai International Parachuting Championship (DIPC) is being held under the patronage of his Highness Sheikh Hamdan Bin Mohammed Bin Rashid Al Maktoum, Crown Prince of Dubaî and Chairman of Dubaï Sports Council.

Sunshine and bright sky were present in the middle of Dubaï higher buildings for this amazing showdown.

Thomas has won the 4th Dubaï International Parachuting Championship (4th DIPC), with a performance of 02 cm in 10 Rounds.

This Result let him break the World Record of Individual Accuracy Landing, (previously 03 cm).
The Record has been validated by the FAI, ( World Air Sports Federation ) in the beginning of 2014.

Thomas has also set the World Record in Team Accuracy Landing in 2011 (with French Team)

Overall World Champion (August 2010)  

In 2010, Thomas is selected to participate to his first World Championship with the French Team.
He won the Overall World Champion title during this competition.

(Overall Rank is got by adding Style Rank and Accuracy Rank; it's a mix of the both disciplines.

Discover this Sport  

You can find many disciplines in Parachuting. Thomas is practicing Accuracy Landing and Style in Competition. It can be easily seen as "Athletics of Parachuting".

Thomas is also playing many ways in the sky: FreeFly / Video / Relative Work / Hybrid Parachut …

This double discipline is requiring a perfect mastership of all sides in the Art of Flying.
Style is a free flight discipline ( as sprint ) and Accuracy Landing is running with opened parachute.

>> Pay attention that there's a specific classifying for each sport but there's also a combined  classifying of both disciplines called "overall".

Accuracy Landing 

Accuracy Landing is running with opened parachute, in individual or team contest. The aim is to touch down on a target whose center is 2 cm in diameter. Target can be a deep foam mattress or an air-filled landing pad.
An electronic recording pad of 32 cm in diameter is set in the middle. It measures score in 1 cm increments up to 16 cm and displays result just after landing.

First part of any competition take place over 8 rounds. Then in the individual competition, after this 8 selective rounds, the top 25% jump a semi-final round. After semi-final round the top 50% are selected for the final round.
Competitor with the lowest cumulative score is declared the winner.

Competitors jump in teams of 5 maximum, exiting the aircraft at 1000 or 1200 meters and opening their parachutes sequentially to allow each competitor a clear approach to the target.

This Sport is pretty unpredictable because Weather Conditions play a very important part. So Accuracy Landing requires high adaptability to aerology and excellent steering control.

It's also the most interesting discipline for spectator due to the closeness of action (a few meters) and the possibility to be practiced everywhere (sport ground, stadium, urban place...).
Today, Accuracy Landing is the most practiced (in competition) discipline of skydiving in the world.

Style 

Style can be considered as sprint of parachuting. This individual discipline is played in free fall.

The idea is to take maximum speed and complete a pre-designated series of manoeuvres as fast and cleanly as possible (speed can exceed 400 km/h / 250 mph)

Jumps are filmed using a ground-based camera (with an exceptional lens to record the performance).

Performance is timed (from the start of the manoeuvre until its completion) and then judged in public at the end of the jump.
Competition includes 4 qualifying rounds and a final for the top 8.
Competitors jump from a height of 2200 m to 2500 m.

They rush into an acceleration stage for 15 to 20 seconds and then run their series of manoeuvres benefiting to the maximum of the stored speed.

Those series consist of Turns and Back-Loops to achieve in a pre-designated order. Incorrect performance of the manoeuvres gives rise to penalties that are added at runtime.

The performance of the athlete is defined in seconds and hundredths of a second.
Competitor with the lowest cumulative time is declared the winner.

Notice the complete sequence is performed by leading international experts in just over 6 seconds, penalties included.

Palmares (end of 2018)

World Record
  World Record of Accuracy Landing Individual – 2013 (Dubai)
  World Record of Accuracy Landing Team – 2011 (Kikinda)

International

Championship 
  3rd of European Championship – Accuracy Landing Individual – 2018 (Erden)
  3rd of European Championship – Overall – 2018 (Erden)
  European Vice-Champion in Accuracy Landing Individual – 2011 (Kikinda)
  European Vice-Champion in Accuracy Landing Team – 2011 (Kikinda)
  3rd of European Championship – Team Overall – 2011 (Kikinda)
  World Champion of Individual Overall – 2010 (Niksic)
  World Vice-Champion of Team Overall – 2010  (Niksic)

World Cup 
  1st Team Accuracy Landing World Cup – 2018 (Peiting)
  1st Individual Accuracy Landing World Cup – 2017 (Locarno)
  1st Team Accuracy Landing World Cup – 2014 (Peiting)
  3rd Team Accuracy Landing World Cup – 2013 (Locarno)
  3rd Individual Accuracy Landing World Cup – 2012 (Bled)
  3rd Team Accuracy Landing World Cup – 2012 (Bled)
  2nd Individual Accuracy Landing World Cup – 2005 (Belluno)

International Trophy 
  Winner of the 4th Dubaï International Parachuting Championship – Individual Accuracy Landing- 2013 (Dubai)
  Winner of Marocco Trophy – Style – 2013  (Beni Mellal)
  Winner of Marocco Trophy – Team Accuracy Landing – 2013  (Beni Mellal)
  Winner of Accuracy European Master of Strasbourg – Team Accuracy Landing – 2012  (Strasbourg)
  2nd of Accuracy European Master of Strasbourg – Team Accuracy Landing – 2011  (Strasbourg)

National

France Championship
  3rd of France Championship – Individual Accuracy Landing – 2017 (Vichy)
  France Champion – Style – 2016 (Vichy)
  France Champion – Overall – 2016 (Vichy)
  France Champion – Accuracy Landing – 2016 (Vichy)
  France Champion – Style – 2013 (Vichy)
  France Champion – Team Accuracy Landing – 2013 (Vichy)
  France Vice-Champion – Individual Accuracy Landing – 2009 (Maubeuge)
  France Vice-Champion – Team Accuracy Landing – 2008 (Metz)
  3rd of France Championship – Team Accuracy Landing – 2003 / 2004 / 2007

France Cup
  Winner of Individual France Cup
  Winner of Team France Cup
  2nd Individual France Cup
  2nd Team France Cup
  3rd Individual France Cup
  3rd Team France Cup

Junior

International
  European Champion – Style – 2005 (Prostějov)
  European Vice-Champion – Overall – 2005 (Prostějov)
  3rd of European Championship – Accuracy Landing – 2005 (Prostějov)

National
  France Champion – 2003 / 2005 / 2006 / 2007 / 2008
  France Vice-Champion – 2002 / 2003 / 2004
  3rd of France Championship – 2001 / 2002 / 2003 / 2005 / 2006

   > Table showing Medals per Discipline

References

External links 
 

French skydivers
1984 births
Living people
Sportspeople from Rennes